San Zanobi may refer to:

The Italian name of Saint Zenobius
Ulmus 'San Zanobi', an elm cultivar named after Saint Zenobius